Agile (1902–after 1914) was an American Thoroughbred racehorse who won the 1905 Kentucky Derby.

Background

Agile was sired by Sir Dixon, a very good runner whose wins included the Belmont, Travers and Withers Stakes and who was the Leading sire in North America in 1901. In addition to Agile, Sir Dixon was also the sire of Champions Running Water and Blue Girl as well as the multiple top level stakes winner and track record breaker, Blues.

Racing career
Ridden by Jack Martin, Agile won the 1905 Kentucky Derby against two other competitors, Ram's Horn and Layson. It was one of the smallest fields since Azra won in 1892.

Following the death of Captain Samuel Brown, his son Frank bought Agile for $5,700 in the July 1906 dispersal sale of the entire racing stable. The last record of Agile racing was coming last in a claiming race at Aqueduct Racetrack in November 1907.

Stud career
Agile sired three registered Thoroughbred offspring out of Texas-bred mares; the fillies Lady Eloise (1913), Chancy M (1915), and Katie Strand (1913). Lady Eloise is the third dam of American Quarter Horse champion Woven Web, a sibling of the Texas-bred Triple Crown winner Assault.

In 1912, Agile was owned by T. Polk of San Antonio and was used as a carriage horse by the family.

Pedigree

References

1902 racehorse births
American racehorses
Racehorses trained in the United States
Racehorses bred in Kentucky
Kentucky Derby winners
Thoroughbred family 24